Wesley John Perschbacher was an author and professor at Moody Bible Institute in Chicago, Illinois where he retired. The son of Garfield Clayton Perschbacher and Rienskje Basstra, Wesley was born August 20, 1932, in Grand Rapids, Michigan. He was a graduate of Grand Rapids School of Bible and Music, Calvin College, and Trinity Evangelical Divinity School. He died July 31, 2012, in Bloomington, Indiana.

Works 
 Refresh Your Greek, 1989 
 The New Analytical Greek Lexicon, 1990 
 New Testament Greek Exegesis, 1992 ASIN B0006F1XRI
 Refresh Your Greek Practical Helps for Reading the New Testament, 1994 ASIN B000M8IV0G
 New Testament Greek Syntax: An Illustrated Manual, 1995 
 Word Pictures of the New Testament Vol. 1, 2003 
 Word Pictures of the New Testament Vol. 2, 2005

References

1932 births
2012 deaths
Calvin University alumni
Moody Bible Institute people
Trinity Evangelical Divinity School alumni